Shadow Bluff is a rock bluff in Antarctica, just west of McGregor Range, at the junction of the Tucker and Leander Glaciers. It is a landmark when sledging on the Tucker Glacier, and is nearly always in shadow, hence the name. Named by the New Zealand Geological Survey Antarctic Expedition (NZGSAE), 1957–58.

Cliffs of Victoria Land
Borchgrevink Coast